is a Japanese footballer. He is a defender.

He was educated at and played for Kansai University before moving to Singapore.

He signed for Albirex Niigata FC (Singapore) from the S.League in 2014 and played for 3 years with the team.  In 2017, he moved on to Cambodia to play for Nagaworld FC.

Club career statistics
As of Jan 2, 2017

References

1993 births
Living people
Japanese footballers
Japanese expatriate footballers
Expatriate footballers in Singapore
Singapore Premier League players
Albirex Niigata Singapore FC players
Association football forwards
Japanese expatriate sportspeople in Singapore
Sportspeople from Kanagawa Prefecture
Nagaworld FC players
Expatriate footballers in Cambodia
Japanese expatriate sportspeople in Cambodia